The Wolf Hotel, located at 104 E. Santa Fe in Ellinwood in Barton County, Kansas, was built in 1894.  It was listed on the National Register of Historic Places in 2002.

It was designed by architect S.S. Voigt in Italianate style. It is narrower,  at the east end.

References

External links

Hotel buildings on the National Register of Historic Places in Kansas
Italianate architecture in Kansas
Mission Revival architecture in Kansas
Commercial buildings completed in 1894
Barton County, Kansas